The 1957–58 NBA season was the Warriors' 12th season in the NBA.

Roster

Regular season

Season standings

x – clinched playoff spot

Record vs. opponents

Game log

Playoffs

|- align="center" bgcolor="#ffcccc"
| 1
| March 15
| @ Syracuse
| L 82–86
| Paul Arizin (24)
| Graboski, Gola (13)
| Jack George (5)
| Onondaga War Memorial
| 0–1
|- align="center" bgcolor="#ccffcc"
| 2
| March 16
| Syracuse
| W 95–93
| Joe Graboski (23)
| Woody Sauldsberry (14)
| George, Gola (5)
| Philadelphia Civic Center
| 1–1
|- align="center" bgcolor="#ccffcc"
| 3
| March 18
| @ Syracuse
| W 101–88
| Paul Arizin (25)
| Joe Graboski (15)
| Joe Graboski (7)
| Onondaga War Memorial
| 2–1
|-

|- align="center" bgcolor="#ffcccc"
| 1
| March 19
| @ Boston
| L 98–107
| Woody Sauldsberry (25)
| Woody Sauldsberry (12)
| Paul Arizin (5)
| Boston Garden
| 0–1
|- align="center" bgcolor="#ffcccc"
| 2
| March 22
| Boston
| L 87–109
| Paul Arizin (25)
| Joe Graboski (15)
| George, Beck (4)
| Philadelphia Civic Center
| 0–2
|- align="center" bgcolor="#ffcccc"
| 3
| March 23
| @ Boston
| L 92–106
| Paul Arizin (25)
| Joe Graboski (15)
| Joe Graboski (8)
| Boston Garden
| 0–3
|- align="center" bgcolor="#ccffcc"
| 4
| March 26
| Boston
| W 112–97
| Gola, Arizin (31)
| Neil Johnston (17)
| Neil Johnston (7)
| Philadelphia Civic Center
| 1–3
|- align="center" bgcolor="#ffcccc"
| 5
| March 27
| @ Boston
| L 88–93
| Paul Arizin (28)
| Woody Sauldsberry (18)
| Tom Gola (6)
| Boston Garden
| 1–4
|-

Awards and records
 Paul Arizin, NBA All-Star Game
 Neil Johnston, NBA All-Star Game
 Woody Sauldsberry, NBA Rookie of the Year Award
 Tom Gola, All-NBA Second Team

References

Golden State Warriors seasons
Philadelphia